Walter Mahlendorf (born 4 January 1935) is a German former sprinter who won a gold medal in the 4 × 100 m relay at the 1960 Summer Olympics. The German team finished second behind the American team, equaling its own world record of 39.5, but the Americans were later disqualified for an incorrect exchange.

Mahlendorf was also a member of the German's 4 × 100 m relay team that won a gold medal at the 1958 European Championships. Mahlendorf never won a national sprint title. After retiring from competitions he worked as a director of a sports complex in Bochum.

References

1935 births
Living people
People from Sarstedt
Sportspeople from Lower Saxony
West German male sprinters
Athletes (track and field) at the 1960 Summer Olympics
Olympic athletes of the United Team of Germany
Olympic gold medalists for the United Team of Germany
European Athletics Championships medalists
Medalists at the 1960 Summer Olympics
Olympic gold medalists in athletics (track and field)